Staffordia toruputuensis is a species of air-breathing land snail, terrestrial pulmonate gastropod mollusk in the family Staffordiidae.

The specific name toruputuensis is apparently according to its type locality, Toruputu Peak.

Distribution 
The type locality of this species is "Toruputu Peak". It is in Dafla Hills in India, because whole family Staffordiidae is endemic to Dafla Hills.

Description 
The shell is globose with oblique columellar margin. The shell of the type specimen is not fully grown. The sculpture is very smooth, with a thick shining epidermis with indistinct striation. The color is light ochraceous olive-green.

The width of the shell is 14.0-16.5 mm. The height of the shell is 7.25 mm.

References
This article incorporates public domain text from the reference.

External links 

Staffordiidae